Rocket Center, West Virginia is the site of a government installation known as Allegany Ballistics Laboratory, part of the Naval Sea Systems Command which is currently operated by Northrop Grumman. There are no residents in Rocket Center.

Also on the site is the Robert C. Byrd Hilltop Office Complex and the Robert C. Byrd Institute for Advanced Flexible Manufacturing, both named for the second-longest-serving member of Congress, the late United States Senator Robert C. Byrd.

References 

Unincorporated communities in Mineral County, West Virginia
Unincorporated communities in West Virginia
Populated places in the Cumberland, MD-WV MSA
Cumberland, MD-WV MSA
Populated places on the North Branch Potomac River